Denis Shkarpeta (born 9 November 1981) is a Uzbekistani former professional road cyclist. He competed in the time trial at the 2004, 2005 and 2006 UCI Road World Championships, as well as in the road race at the 2005 UCI Road World Championships.

Major results
2003
 1st Schio-Ossario del Pasubio
2004
 2nd Giro del Valdarno
 3rd Trofeo Città di Brescia
 5th Overall Giro della Valle d'Aosta
1st Stage 4
 5th Cronoscalata Internazionale Gardone
 10th Overall Giro Ciclistico d'Italia
2005
 1st Trofeo Torino-Biella
 1st Coppa Cicogna
 1st Circuito Molinese
 4th Giro della Valsesia 2
 6th Giro della Valsesia 1
 7th Piccolo Giro di Lombardia

References

External links
 

Living people
1981 births
Uzbekistani male cyclists
21st-century Uzbekistani people